Football Club Nart Sukhum is a football club in the city of Sukhumi, in the state of Abkhazia that competes in the Abkhazian Premier League.

History
Founded on 1997 in the city of Sukhumi in the state of Abkhazia, the club is affiliated with the Football Federation of Abkhazia.

Titles

Abkhazian Premier League
The club has been Abkhazian Premier League champion in 13 editions, as well as a six-time runner-up a third place finisher three times. 

Champions (13)
1999, 1999/00, 2003, 2005, 2007, 2008, 2009, 2011, 2013, 2016, 2018, 2018/19, 2020

Runners-Up (6)
2001/02, 2004, 2006, 2010,2012, 2015

Third Place (3)
1998 - 2000/01 - 2017

Abkhazian Cup

The club has already reached the final of the competition in 18 editions and in 11 of them it was champion. 

Champions (11)
2001, 2002, 2003, 2005, 2006, 2007, 2008, 2014, 2016, 2017, 2019.

Runners-Up (7)
1999, 2000, 2004, 2011, 2012, 2013, 2018

Abkhazia Super Cup
The club has played in the Abkhazia Super Cup 15 times, reaching the title 9 times.

Champions (9)
1999, 2000, 2008, 2009, 2011, 2013, 2016, 2018,2019.

Runners-Up (6)
2001, 2002, 2006, 2012, 2014, 2017.

References 

Association football clubs established in 1997